This article shows the rosters of all participating teams at the 2015–16 Azerbaijan Women's Volleyball Super League 
in Baku, Azerbaijan.

Teams

Azerrail Baku
The following is the roster of the Azerí club Azerrail Baku in the 2015–16 Azerbaijan Women's Volleyball Super League.

Head coach:  Bülent Karslioglu

Azeryol Baku
The following is the roster of the Azerí club Azeryol Baku in the 2015–16 Azerbaijan Women's Volleyball Super League.

Head coach:  Aleksandr Chervyakov

Gençlik

Lokomotiv Baku
The following is the roster of the Azerí club Lokomotiv Baku in the 2015–16 Azerbaijan Women's Volleyball Super League.

Head coach:  Carlo Parisi

Tbilisi

Telekom Baku
The following is the roster of the Azerí club Telekom Baku in the 2015–16 Azerbaijan Women's Volleyball Super League.

Head coach:  Zoran Gajic

References

External links
Official website

Volleyball competitions in Azerbaijan
Volleyball squads
Women's volleyball squads